One Fine Day is a children's picture book by Nonny Hogrogian.  Released by Macmillan, it was the recipient of the Caldecott Medal for illustration in 1972. The story is a retelling of an Armenian folktale.

Synopsis
A woman catches a fox drinking her glass of milk and cuts off his tail. The fox begs her for his tail back, and she agrees to return it if the fox replaces the milk he stole. The fox approaches a series of other animals and people, each of whom wants something in return for their help. After fulfilling everybody's needs, the woman sews the fox's tailback onto him.

References

1971 children's books
American children's books
American picture books
Caldecott Medal–winning works
English-language books
Books about foxes
Fictional thieves
Children's books about friendship
United States in fiction
Forests in fiction